Palpita asiaticalis is a moth in the family Crambidae. It was described by Inoue in 1994. It is found in Taiwan, China (Guizhou, Yunnan), Vietnam, Thailand, India, Nepal and Cambodia.

References

Moths described in 1994
Palpita
Moths of Asia